The Greater Law is a 1917 American silent drama film directed by Lynn Reynolds and starring Myrtle Gonzalez, Gretchen Lederer and George Hernandez.

Cast
 Myrtle Gonzalez as Barbara Henderson
 Gretchen Lederer as 'Seattle' Lou
 Maude Emory as Anne Malone 
 G.M. Rickerts as Jimmy Henderson
 Lawrence Peyton as Cort Dorian
 George Hernandez as Tully Winkle
 Jack Curtis as Laberge
 Jean Hersholt as Basil Pelly

References

Bibliography
 Robert B. Connelly. The Silents: Silent Feature Films, 1910-36, Volume 40, Issue 2. December Press, 1998.

External links
 

1917 films
1917 drama films
1910s English-language films
American silent feature films
Silent American drama films
American black-and-white films
Universal Pictures films
Films directed by Lynn Reynolds
1910s American films